The 1920 USC Trojans football team represented the University of Southern California (USC) in the 1920 college football season. In their second year under head coach Gus Henderson, the Trojans compiled a 6–0 record and outscored their opponents by a combined total of 170 to 21.

Schedule

References

USC Trojans
USC Trojans football seasons
College football undefeated seasons
USC Trojans football